The Old Carpet Factory (Colloredo-Mansfeld Residence) is a historical house located in Hydra island, Greece. It was originally built for the prominent Tsamados family in the late 18th century. It has gone through many renovations and has served as a residence, as well as previously being used as an industrial school, a factory and a painting studio. The lower part of the house is now used as a recording studio.

History 
The family of Greek naval officer Anastasios Tsamados first built and occupied the home in the late 18th century.  Its large size and ornamental architecture stand out from the more traditional homes from this period on Hydra Island, which feature lime-washed stone construction, narrow rectangular spaces, and plain roof tiles without ornament. In contrast, the Tsamados' mansion was built with open interiors, very high ceilings treated with carved wood, door casings, stone arches, geometrical designs, an open terrace overlooking the harbor, and a walled private garden. These features established it among the manors of wealthy Hydriot shipowners and captains of that era.

The house was later donated to the church and repurposed as a working weaving school. It produced textiles and carpets and was therefore known locally as the "Old Carpet Factory".

The home's artistic period began in the 1950s when American sculptor John La Farge bought it and renovated it. He removed parts of the deteriorated roof and glazed the retaining arch to create a large window, opening into a private courtyard. La Farge's arch, together with three large elegant windows, became the signature architectural feature of the house. In 1976, painter Kristina Colloredo-Mansfeld purchased the house. In 2015, the current owner, Stephan Colloredo-Mansfeld, turned the lower part of the house into a recording studio, incorporating the acoustics of high ceilings and water cisterns.

Current use 
From the late 20th century onward, the house became an unofficial art residency by hosting and supporting projects of artists such as Sebastien Tellier, Ariel Kalma, Margherita Chiarva, and Gorkem Sen, the inventor of yaybahar.

Currently, the facility houses both a music recording studio and a temporary residence for up to twelve people.

In popular culture 
A pulp-noir novel "De les kouventa / Δε λες κουβέντα" (“Athens Undocumented”) by French-Greek writer Makis Malafekas describes the events at the Old Carpet Factory house with one of the centre characters drawn from Stephan Colloredo-Mansfeld.

"Power of Power" EP by Mind Gamers was partially composed and recorded at the Old Carpet studio with the promotional video featuring the residence and Hydra island.

Notable owners 

 Anastasios Tsamados, a Greek admiral of the Greek War of Independence.
 John La Farge, sculptor, and architect.
 Kristina Colloredo-Mansfeld, artist and a member of the Czech-Austrian aristocratic Colloredo-Mannsfeld family.
 Stephan Colloredo-Mansfeld, music producer.

References 

Hydra (island)
18th century in Greece
Architecture in Greece